Port Adelaide Football Club (AFL Women's) is a professional Australian rules football team based in Alberton, South Australia. The team plays in the AFL Women's (AFLW) competition. The team is part of the Port Adelaide Football Club.

In May 2021, the club was granted a license by the AFL to compete in the league from the start of the 2022/23 season. The team will play its home games out of Alberton Oval, in Alberton, South Australia.

History

Early women's Football 

The earliest recorded instance of the Port Adelaide Football Club fielding a Women's side was in 1918 for a match played on Alberton Oval to raise funds for the Port Adelaide Workers Memorial against a team representing Thebarton. Port Adelaide was captained by Eileen Reid. In 1951 Port Adelaide awarded Ruby Dewar with life membership at the club, the first SANFL club to bestow the honour upon a woman, with club secretary Bob McLean praising her contribution saying that she had over 29 years "organised probably more than 100 functions for us — balls, dinners, competitions — as convener of the women's social committee." Port Adelaide has given 17 women life membership at the club. On 8 March 2004 Jenny Williams organised a Women's Showdown as a curtain raiser to Port Adelaide's home game at Football Park. The Port Adelaide Women's side won the match 16.5 (101) to Adelaide's 1.1 (7) with Erin Phillips considered a unanimous best on ground. The Port Adelaide Football Club also supported the local Port Adelaide Women's Football Club (nicknamed the Magpies and wearing the "Prison Bar" guernsey) who played in the Adelaide Football League from 2003-2018

2015–present: AFLW Bids and Formation
On 16 December 2015 Erin Phillips entered into an agreement with Port Adelaide to be their marquee AFL Women's (AFLW) signing on the contingency the club received a licence for that competition. However, due to the logistical demands placed on Port Adelaide's administration and staff associated with the club's China program, which sought to ensure the club had sustainable revenue streams, the club was deemed not capable to bid for an AFLW licence for the 2017 AFL Women's season. Subsequently, the Adelaide Crows signed Phillips as a rookie. After this the  local Port Adelaide Women's Football Club in the Adelaide Football League folded. Port Adelaide turned its attention towards entering a Women's side in the SANFL Women's League (SANFLW) competition but this approach was rejected by the South Australian Football Commission. In May 2021, the AFL Commission announced that the remaining four clubs without AFLW teams would be admitted to the competition by the end of 2023, with the clubs to bid for entry order. Port Adelaide's bid to enter the competition was successful, with the AFL Commission deciding all four clubs would debut in the AFLW in the 2022/23 season. On 26 October 2021 Port Adelaide appointed Juliet Haslam as the clubs head of Women's football. On 3 February 2022 Port Adelaide announced Naomi Maidment as the clubs inaugural AFLW list manager. On 17 February 2022 Rachael Sporn was appointed to an Operations Manager role to organise the logistics of running an AFLW program at Port Adelaide.

Current squad
In April 2022, former  captain and  premiership player Lauren Arnell was announced as Port Adelaide's inaugural AFLW coach, and two weeks later, three-time  premiership player Erin Phillips, whose father Greg played in 343 games and eight premierships with the club in the South Australian National Football League (SANFL), was announced as the club's inaugural AFLW player signing. On the opening day of the expansion signing period in May, Port Adelaide signed Adelaide players Angela Foley and Justine Mules, Brisbane midfielder Maria Moloney,  forward Gemma Houghton and twins Laquoiya and Litonya Cockatoo-Motlap, the nieces of former  and  player Che Cockatoo-Collins. The next day, Port Adelaide signed Phillips, Brisbane defender Indy Tahau and  midfielder Ebony O'Dea, while also finalising its AFLW coaching team. In August, Phillips was named Port Adelaide's inaugural AFLW captain.

Corporate

Administrative positions 
 Chairman: David Koch
 Chief executive: Matthew Richardson
 Football operations: Chris Davies
 Board members:
 Kevin Osborn (deputy chairman)
 Cos Cardone
 Darren Cahill
 Holly Ransom
 Jamie Restas
 Andrew Day
 Kathy Nagle
 Christine Zeitz
 Rob Snowdon

Sponsors 
 Current major sponsors 
 GFG Alliance
KFC
 MG Motor

References

External links

Port Adelaide Football Club
AFL Women's clubs
Sporting clubs in Adelaide
Australian rules football clubs in South Australia